= Union Street Pedestrian Bridge =

Bridge in Seattle, Washington, U.S.

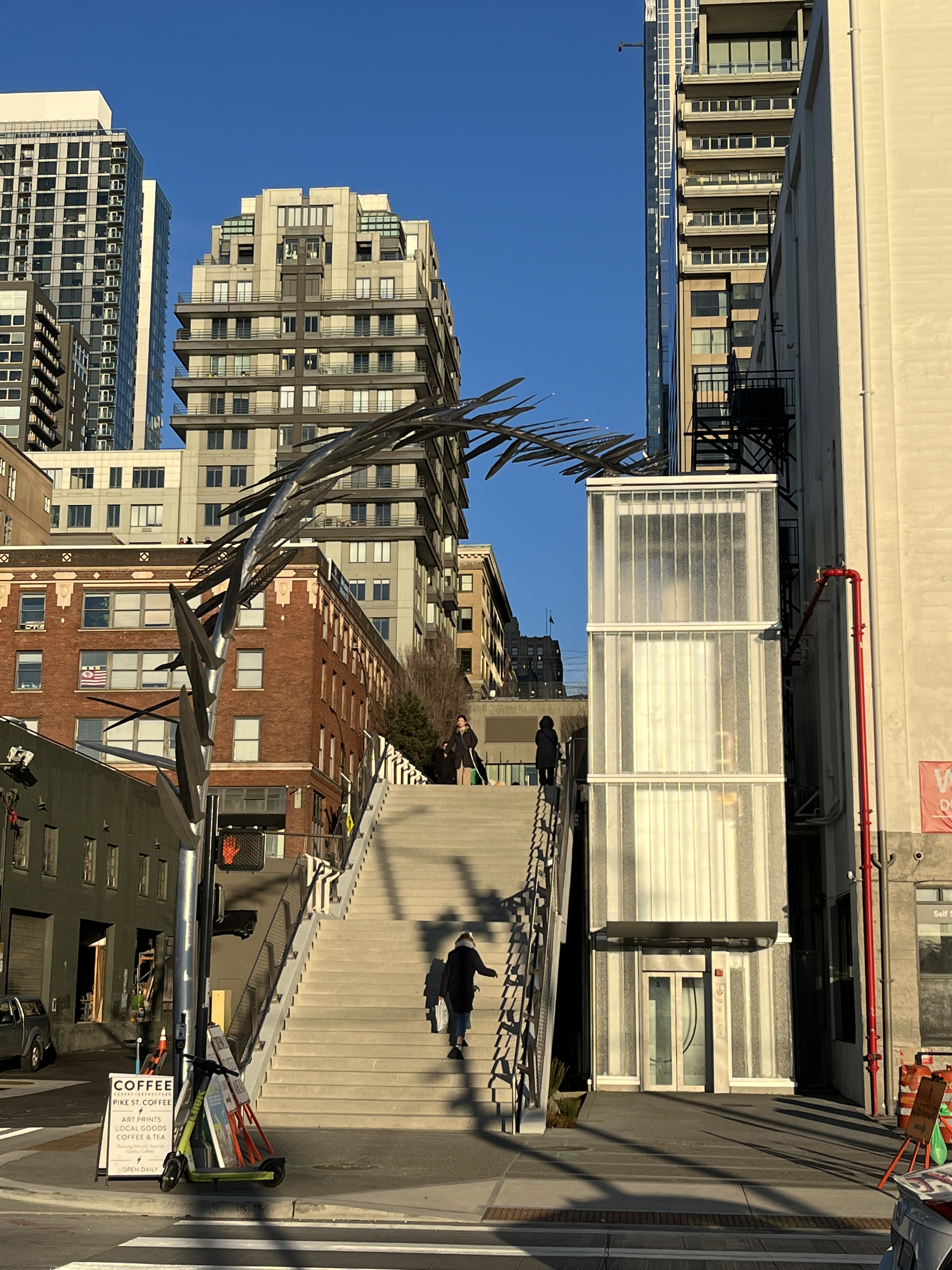
- Coordinates: 47°36′26″N 122°20′26″W
- Locale: Seattle, Washington, U.S.

Location
- Interactive map of Union Street Pedestrian Bridge

The Union Street Pedestrian Bridge is a bridge in Seattle, in the U.S. state of Washington. The bridge connects Western Avenue to the waterfront and replaces a metal staircase. The bridge, stairs and elevator opened in December 2022 following approximately two years of construction. The project features two artworks by local artist Norie Sato, including a screen wall and an approximately 37-foot (11 m) tall steel sculpture inspired by a feather.
